The 2012 AFC Futsal Club Championship qualification will be held in late 2012 to determine 4 spots to the final tournament in Kuwait City. The teams finishing first, second and third in the 2011 AFC Futsal Club Championship, and the host Champion for the 2012 competition, receive automatic byes to Finals.

Format 
Fifteen teams registered in qualifying action for 4 places in the finals. Reigning champions Japan, runners-up Iran, Lebanon and 2012 edition hosts Kuwait have direct entry into the tournament proper. The remaining eleven team will play in the qualification rounds. The result of the draw for the groups was announced on 26 January 2012. Zone 1 teams will play a round robin with the top two qualifying to the final tournament. Zone 2 will play a round-robin groupstage, with the top two teams qualifying to the semi-finals. The winner of both semi-finals will the prograss to the final tournament as well.

Zones

West, South and Central Asian (Zone 1) 
The matches will be played in Tashkent, Uzbekistan from March 19 and 24, 2012.

ASEAN/East (Zone 2) 
The matches will be played in Ho Chi Minh City, Vietnam from March 19 and 24, 2012.

Group A

Group B

Semi-finals

Final

Top Goalscorers

Top Goalscorers, Zone 1 
7 Goals
  Dilshod Irsaliev (Ardus Tashkent)

Top Goalscorers, Zone 2

Group A 
2 Goals
  Luu Quynh Toan (Thai Son Nam)
  Junior (Guangzhou Baiyunshan)

Group B 
9 Goals
  Suphawut Thueanklang (GH Bank RBAC)

Qualifiers 

The following eight teams will play the final tournament.

Host nation
 Yarmouk (Kuwait Futsal Winner)
2011 tournament	
 Nagoya Oceans (F. League (1st))
 Giti Pasand Isfahan (Iranian Futsal Super League (2nd))
 All Sports (Lebanese Premiere League (3rd))

East and Southeast
 GH Bank RBAC (1st)
 Thai Son Nam (2nd)
South and Central Asian	
 Ardus Tashkent (1st)
 Al Rayyan (2nd)

References

External links
 Official site

qualification
qualification
International futsal competitions hosted by Uzbekistan
International futsal competitions hosted by Vietnam
2012 in Uzbekistani football
2012 in Vietnamese football